The Executioner is a 1970 British cold war neo noir spy thriller film directed by Sam Wanamaker in Panavision and starring George Peppard as secret agent John Shay who suspects his colleague Adam Booth, played by Keith Michell, is a double agent. In the film, Peppard's character tries to prove the double role of his colleague to his spy-masters and when he fails to do so he kills him. It was produced by Charles H. Schneer for Columbia Pictures and filmed in Panavision and Eastmancolor.

Plot
John Shay (George Peppard), a British MI5 agent, had grown up in the United States, and who was nearly killed while on assignment abroad. Convinced that he was framed, he returns to London to uncover the mole responsible for the set-up. John Shay suspects that his colleague Adam Booth (Keith Michell) is a Russian spy. The action takes place in London, Athens, Istanbul and Corfu, where Shay goes in his investigation trying to gather evidence that Booth is a double agent. When Shay's superiors are not convinced, and even after a special hearing clears Booth of any wrongdoing, he takes matters into  his own hands and executes Booth.

Shay assumes the identity of Booth, and, with the assistance of Booth's widow Sarah (Joan Collins) and his own girlfriend Polly (Judy Geeson), he launches into an investigation to uncover Booth's connections. Shay maintains a romantic relationship with both women. Booth's wife is the romantic interest of Shay and British scientist Philip Crawford (George Baker), who provided information to Shay about Booth being a double agent. Shay's superiors are Col. Scott (Nigel Patrick) and Vaughan Jones (Charles Gray). Polly assists him in his investigations by providing him with information apparently confirming his suspicions.

Shay finds a plane ticket in Booth's pocket which he then uses to fly to Athens along with Booth's widow, who is unaware that her husband has been murdered by Shay. Upon arrival in Athens, Shay assumes Booth's identity and subsequently goes to Corfu, where he is captured along with Sarah by Soviet agents who want Crawford in return for the freedom of their captives. A CIA agent under the name of Professor Parker (Alexander Scourby) manages to free them both. Colonel Scott (Shay's superior) reveals that Sarah's husband was indeed a double agent who was used by MI5 to supply the Soviets with false information.

Cast
 George Peppard as John Shay
 Joan Collins as Sarah Booth
 Judy Geeson as Polly Bendel
 Oskar Homolka as Racovsky
 Charles Gray as Vaughan Jones
 Nigel Patrick as Colonel Scott
 Keith Michell as Adam Booth
 George Baker as Phillip Crawford
 Alexander Scourby as Prof. Parker
 Peter Bull as Butterfield
 Ernest Clark as Roper
 Peter Dyneley as Balkov
 Gizela Dali as Anna

Reception 
Film and Television Daily writes that the film recreates in an exciting way the "recurring themes" of espionage and counter-espionage, that "embrace the fantastic and implausible".

Variety criticises the redundancy in the film and calls it a "triple-cross suspenser" where "interest fades fast".

Paul Mavis writes that the film has a "twisty plot" and a good cast and praises the direction of Wanamaker but criticises the complexity of the plot which, according to Mavis, clashes with the action parts. Mavis also calls for "tighter editing".

The book Film Fatales: Women in Espionage Films and Television, 1962-1973 calls Peppard's acting "easygoing" and criticises Wanamaker's direction as making the film feel slower-paced than it actually is.

Films and Filming writes that Peppard plays his role in such wooden fashion as to make a believable spy but sometimes "he overemphasises his inflexibility"; however, director Wanamaker keeps the pace tight enough that Peppard's inflexibility does not really affect the film to any great extent.

References

External links 
 
 
 
 

1970 films
1970s spy thriller films
Films directed by Sam Wanamaker
British spy thriller films
Cold War spy films
Films set in Athens
Films set in Corfu
Films set in London
Films set in Istanbul
Films shot in Greece
Films shot in Corfu
Films scored by Ron Goodwin
Columbia Pictures films
Films produced by Charles H. Schneer
British neo-noir films
1970s English-language films
1970s British films